Mob Rules is the tenth studio album by English heavy metal band Black Sabbath, released in November 1981. It followed 1980's Heaven and Hell, and was the second album to feature lead singer Ronnie James Dio and the first with drummer Vinny Appice. Neither musician would appear on a Black Sabbath studio album again until the 1992 album Dehumanizer.

Produced and engineered by Martin Birch, the album received a remastered Deluxe Edition release in 2010 and an expanded edition in 2021.

Recording
The first new recording Black Sabbath made after the Heaven and Hell album was a version of the title track "The Mob Rules" for the soundtrack of the film Heavy Metal. The track "E5150" is also heard in the film but not included on the soundtrack. According to guitarist Tony Iommi's autobiography Iron Man: My Journey Through Heaven & Hell with Black Sabbath, the band began writing and rehearsing songs for Mob Rules at a rented house in Toluca Lake in Los Angeles. Initially the band hoped to record in their own studio to save money and actually purchased a sound desk; but, according to Iommi, "We just couldn't get a guitar sound. We tried it in the studio. We tried it in the hallway. We tried it everywhere but it just wasn't working. We'd bought a studio and it wasn't working!" The band eventually recorded the album at the Record Plant in Los Angeles.

Mob Rules was the first Sabbath album to feature Vinny Appice on drums, who had replaced original member Bill Ward in the middle of the Heaven and Hell tour. Asked by Joe Matera in 2007 if working with a new drummer was jarring after so many years, bassist and lyricist Geezer Butler replied, "No, because Vinny was a big fan of the band and loved Bill's playing. Bill was one of his favourite drummers and so he knew all his parts and my bass parts and he adjusted accordingly to everybody in the band. He was brilliant. He came in and totally filled in Bill's shoes."

In an interview for the concert film Neon Nights: 30 Years of Heaven and Hell, Butler cites "The Sign of the Southern Cross" as his favourite Mob Rules track because "it gave me a chance to experiment with some bass effects".  The album was the last time the band worked with producer and engineer Martin Birch, who went on to work with Iron Maiden until his retirement in 1992. Iommi explained to Guitar World in 1992, "We were all going through a lot of problems at that time, most of it related to drugs. Even the producer, Martin Birch, was having drug problems, and it hurt the sound of that record. Once that happens to your producer, you’re really screwed."

Mob Rules would be singer Ronnie James Dio's second and final studio recording with Black Sabbath until the Mob Rules-era line-up reunited for 1992's Dehumanizer. The seeds of discontent appear to have sprouted when Dio was offered a solo deal by Warner Brothers, with Iommi stating in his memoir, "After the (Heaven and Hell) record became such a great success, Warner Brothers extended the contract at the same time, offering Ronnie a solo deal. That felt a bit odd to us, because we were a band and we didn't want to separate anybody." Dio confided in an interview on the Neon Nights: 30 Years of Heaven and Hell DVD that the recording of Mob Rules was far more difficult for him than Heaven and Hell because "we approached the writing very much differently than the first one. Geezer had gone so we wrote in a very controlled environment in a living room with little amplifiers. And with Mob Rules we hired a studio, turned up as loud as possible and smashed through it all. So it made for a different kind of an attitude".

Vinny Appice stated in a 2021 interview with Pariah Burke that the writing for the album was largely a collaborative process done through jam sessions. He stated, "We put [songs] together by jamming and playing together and putting ideas in the pot. It's a natural way of doing it and it works really well for us. That's how we did all the big albums like Mob Rules and Holy Diver. Nobody came in with a song.”

Iommi reflected to Guitar World in 1992, "Mob Rules was a confusing album for us. We started writing songs differently for some reason, and ended up not using a lot of really great material. That line-up was really great, and the whole thing fell apart for very silly reasons — we were all acting like children." The major problem, noted by Mick Wall in his book Black Sabbath: Symptom of the Universe, was that the balance of power within the band had shifted: "With Bill and Ozzy happy to leave the heavy lifting to Tony and Geezer, in terms of songwriting, coming into the studio only when they were called, even as their flair deserted them over the final, dismal Ozzy-era albums, at least everybody knew where they stood.  Now, though, the creative chemistry had shifted."

"I still like that album", Iommi reflected in 1997.

Release and reception

Mob Rules was released on 4 November 1981 to mixed reviews.  In the US it went gold and in the UK it reached the Top 20 and spawned two chart singles, the title track and "Turn Up the Night". AllMusic's Greg Prato called the album "underrated" and enthused, "Mob Rules was given a much punchier in-your-face mix by Birch, who seemed re-energized after his work on new wave of British heavy metal upstarts Iron Maiden's Killers album. Essentially Mob Rules is a magnificent record, with the only serious problem being the sequencing of the material which mirrors Heaven and Hell's almost to a tee."

Guitarist Tony Iommi acknowledged this common criticism in his memoir, admitting that he was frustrated at being accused of making Heaven and Hell part two and speculating that the band would have been criticized regardless of their approach. 

Seven of the album's tracks were played live on the Mob Rules Tour. "E5150" was used as an intro tape, and "Over and Over" was the only song not featured on the tour in any way. While the title track was the only song from this album regularly played by Black Sabbath on subsequent tours, "Falling Off the Edge of the World" was performed live by Heaven & Hell (which consisted of the same Black Sabbath lineup that recorded Mob Rules), and "Sign of the Southern Cross" occasionally played live by Dio.

J.D. Constantine of Rolling Stone gave Mob Rules a negative review in February 1986. Profiling the album in 2008, Bryan Reesman noted: "Even with Dio bringing in more fantasy-based lyrics and moving the group away from seemingly Satanic verses, the title track to Mob Rules, not to mention its menacing cover could easily imply a call to anarchy. But beyond the snarling guitars and vocals is actually a cautionary tale against mindless mayhem."

Track listing

Standard Edition
All songs were written by Ronnie James Dio, Tony Iommi, and Geezer Butler. All lyrics were written by Ronnie James Dio except where noted.

2010 Deluxe Edition 
Disc 2 is a repackaging of the previously released limited edition CD Live at Hammersmith Odeon.

2021 40th Anniversary Edition 
Disc one tracks 12, 17 & 18 and all disc two tracks previously unreleased.

Personnel

Black Sabbath
Ronnie James Dio – vocals
Tony Iommi – guitars
Geezer Butler – bass
Vinny Appice – drums

Additional performer
Geoff Nicholls – keyboards

Production
Produced and engineered by Martin Birch
Assistant engineers – Eddie DeLena, Angelo Arcuri
Technicians to Black Sabbath – Ian Ferguson, Michael Howse, Les Martin, Peter Resty
Remastered by Dan Hersch (2008 reissue)
Cover illustration by Greg Hildebrandt
Art direction by Richard Seireeni

Release history

Charts

Album

Singles

Certifications

References

External links
 

1981 albums
Albums produced by Martin Birch
Albums recorded at Record Plant (Los Angeles)
Black Sabbath albums
Vertigo Records albums
Warner Records albums